Metz is a German surname. Notable people with the surname include:

Alexander Metz (born 1987), German rugby union player
Belinda Metz (born 1960), Canadian vocalist
Bert Metz (born 1945), Dutch climate policy expert
Blythe Metz (born 1977), American actress
Charles Metz (1799–1853), Luxembourgian politician and lawyer
Chrissy Metz (born 1980), American actress
Christian Metz (critic) (1931–1993), French film theorist 
Christian Metz (Inspirationalist) (1794–1867), German-American colonist
Christian Metz (theorist) (1931–1993), French film theorist
Danielle De Metz (b. 1938), French actress
Dick Metz (1908–1993), American golfer
 Don Metz (architect) (born 1940), American architect
 Don Metz (ice hockey) (1916–2007), Canadian ice hockey player
Donald J. Metz (1924–1999), American scientist
Émile Metz (1835–1904), Luxembourgish engineer and politician
Florian Metz (born 1985), Austrian footballer
Frederick Metz (1832–1901), German-American founder and brewer
Gautier de Metz (13th century), French priest and poet
Gertrud Metz (1746–1793/4), German painter
Glenn Metz, founder of the Metz Gang drug ring in New Orleans, Louisiana, USA
Gunther Metz (born 1967), German football coach 
Henry Metz, American pediatric ophthalmologist
Herman A. Metz (1867–1934), German-American politician and businessman
Horst Metz (1945-2022), German politician 
Jake Metz (born 1991), American football player
Jaap Metz (1941–2016), Dutch journalist and politician
Johann Baptist Metz (1928–2019), German Catholic theologian
Kimberly Metz, American film director and photographer 
Lance Metz, South African mountaineer
Larry Metz (born 1955), American politician 
Lenny Metz (1899–1953), American baseball player
Léon Metz (1842–1928), Luxembourgish politician 
Melinda Metz (born 1962), American author
Michael Metz (born 1964), German field hockey player
Mike Metzger (born 1975), American motocross rider
Milton Metz (1921–2017), American TV and radio personality
Nick Metz (1914–1990), Canadian ice hockey player
Rebecca Metz, American actress
Simon "Schlitzie" Metz (1901–1971), American sideshow freak
Stefan Metz (born 1951), German ice hockey player
Steven Metz (born 1956), American professor and author
Thierry Metz, (1956–1997), French poet
Thomas F. Metz (born 1948), American army general 
Trevor Metz (born 1972), Canadian journalist, documentary narrator, radio talk show host, and columnist
Vittorio Metz (1904–1984), Italian screenwriter and director
William D. Metz (1914–2013), American historian
 Metz family, a prominent historical political family in Luxembourg, including:
 Charles Metz (1799–1853)
 Norbert Metz (1811–1885)
 Auguste Metz (1812–1854)
 Léon Metz (1842–1928)

See also
Arnulf of Metz (c.582–640), Frankish saint
Clement of Metz, Eastern Orthodox and Roman Catholic saint
Itta of Metz(592–652), Roman Catholic saint
Odo of Metz (c.792–805), architect from the Carolingian Empire under Charlemagne
Motz (surname)

German-language surnames